Sarh, formerly French colonial Fort Archambault, is the capital of the Moyen-Chari Region and of the Department of Barh Köh in Chad.

History
Fort Archambault (Sarh) was founded by the colonial French Equatorial Africa, for returnees from the labour camps associated with the construction of the Congo-Ocean Railway. A significantly large textiles complex was constructed by the French in Sarh in 1967.

The residents of Sarh suffered a meningococcal meningitis epidemic in 1990.

Geography
It was named after the Sara people of southern Chad.

It is the third largest city in Chad, after N'Djamena and Moundou.

Climate 
Like other parts of southern Chad and the East Sudanian savanna, Sarh has a typical tropical savanna climate (Köppen Aw), with a wet season and a dry season and the temperature being hot year-round. The hottest time of year is from March to May, just before the wet season starts.

Sarh receives  of rain over 86 precipitation days, with a distinct wet and dry season like most tropical savanna climates. December receives no precipitation at all, with almost no rain falling from November to March. August, the wettest month, receives  of rainfall on average. August also has 18 precipitation days, which is the most of any month. Humidity is much higher in the wet season than the dry season, with February having a humidity at 29% and August having a humidity at 82%. Sarh receives 2737.3 hours of sunshine annually on average, with the sunshine being distributed fairly evenly across the year, although it is lower during the wet season. December and January receive the most sunshine, while July receives the least.

Economy
Sarh is now a major transport hub. It is served by the Sarh Airport (IATA airport code SRH).

It is a center for the cotton industry, due to its warm and seasonally wet climate. It is also an important center for commercial fishing in the Chari River.

The city is known as a center of nightlife in the region.  Attractions in the city include the Sarh National Museum.

Demographics

Education 

Sarh is home to various educational institutions:

High schools

Lycées−High schools include:
 Lycée Ahmed Mangué (public)
 Lycée-Collège Charles Lwanga (private, Catholic)
 Lycée-Collège Humanité (private, Baptist)

Universities

 IUSAES—Institut Universitaire des Sciences Agronomiques et de l'Environnement de Sarh — a tertiary college, established in 1997.
 University of Sarh — a public university, established in 2010
 ISMEA—Institute of Science of Management and Economic Applied — founded by NGOs, established in 2008.

Twin towns—Sister cities
Sarh is twinned with:
 Cherbourg-Octeville, France (since 2001)

Notable people 

 Fatimé Dordji

See also
Chari River topics
Regions of Chad

References

Populated places in Chad
Chari River
Moyen-Chari Region
French Equatorial Africa